Many journalists in Turkey are being persecuted and kept in jail all over the country.  Below is an extensive list of the prisoners, past and present.

231 journalists have been arrested after 15 July 2016 alone. According to the Gülen movement-linked (which is designated as a terrorist organization by Turkey, Pakistan, and the GCC) advocacy group Stockholm Center for Freedom that tracks cases of prosecutions of Turkish journalists, in the year 2018, 122 journalists received a jail sentence.

List of arrested journalists

The following is a non-exhaustive list of arrested journalists in Turkey: A new updated and searchable list of jailed journalists is compiled by Stockholm Center for Freedom which stated that 165 journalists were arrested, 88 convicted and 167 wanted as of 8 May 2020.

Grounds for prosecution
Kemalist and / or nationalist journalists were arrested on charges referring to the Ergenekon case and several left-wing and Kurdish journalists were arrested on charges of engaging in propaganda for the PKK listed as a terrorist organization. After the corruption operation in 17/25 December 2013 and in particular after coup attempt of 15 July, the apartments of journalists were raided and sent to prison. The journalists such as Mehmet Baransu, Ece Sevim Ozturk, who were investigating the ‘  Coup attempt’, were arrested. Media organizations such as Zaman newspaper, Cihan News Agency and Samanyolu TV, which were affiliated to the Fethullah Gülen group, were confiscated. Journalists working in these institutions were imprisoned. Life imprisonment was given to journalists such as Hidayet Karaca and Ahmet Altan. With the dozens of published decrees, newspapers, TV, radio, magazine, website was closed. The legal framework on organised crime and terrorism is imprecise and contains definitions which are open to abuse, leading to numerous indictments and convictions. Moreover, its interpretation by prosecutors and courts is uneven and is not in line with the European Convention on Human Rights or the case-law of the European Court of Human Rights, according to the European Commission. No clear distinction is made between incitement to violence and the expression of nonviolent ideas. The application of Articles 6 and 7 of the Anti-Terror Law in combination with Articles 220 and 314 of the Turkish Criminal Code leads to abuses; in short, writing an article or making a speech can still lead to a court case and a long prison sentence for membership or leadership of a terrorist organisation. Together with possible pressure on the press by state officials and the threat of possible firing of critical journalists, this situation can lead to a widespread self-censorship. Frequent website bans are a cause for serious concern and there is a need to revise the law on the internet.

Most journalists are in prison based on the following laws:
 The Anti-Terror Law of Turkey (also known as Terörle Mücadele Yasası, TMY), Articles 5 and 7 relating to articles of the Criminal Code on terrorist offences and organizations or assisting members of or making propaganda in connection with such organizations, as well as the lengthening of sentences;
 The Criminal Code of Turkey (also known as Türk Ceza Kanunu, TCK), Article 314 on establishing, commanding or becoming member of an armed organization with the aim of committing certain offences.

Concerns
Concerns persisted over the rights of the defence, lengthy pre-trial detention and excessively long and catch-all indictments, leading to significantly enhanced public scrutiny of the legitimacy of these trials.

A report issued by the OSCE Representative on Freedom of the Media describes a number of concerns concerning the case of arrested journalists in Turkey:
 Courts often impose exceptionally long imprisonment sentences. The longest conviction is 166 years and the longest jail sentence sought for a journalist is 3,000 years. 
 Many journalists face double life sentences if convicted, some without possibility for parole. Courts do not tend to grant pre-trial release of defendants. 
 There is concern that arrests and long pre-trial detentions without conviction are used as a form of intimidation. 
 Pre-trial detentions remain very long. In some cases journalists held in prison for up to three years are still awaiting trial. Some journalists have been imprisoned for more than five years while their trial is ongoing. 
 Journalists often face several trials and are often convicted for several offences. There is one journalist who faces 150 court cases.
 Media outlets reporting about sensitive issues (including terrorism or anti-government activities) are often regarded by the authorities as the publishing organs of illegal organizations. Courts often consider reporting about such issues as equal to supporting them.
 Journalists are often imprisoned in F-tipi cezaevi (F-type high security prisons), where they have to serve their time with the most dangerous criminals. It is also not uncommon to punish journalists with solitary confinement for extended time periods.
 According to a report published by Amnesty International on 30 March 2020, Turkey government is said to be speeding up the process of preparing a draft law that intends to release approximately 100,000 prisoners amid growing concerns about the spread of COVID-19 in prisons. However, the law overlooks the journalists, political prisoners, and human rights defenders, who are said to remain jailed despite overcrowding and unsanitary living conditions already posing severe health threat.
On 3 July 2020, four Amnesty International activists were convicted by the Turkish court for "assisting a terrorist organization". The human rights group denies all the charges and said that every allegation against its members has been "comprehensively exposed as a baseless slur."

See also
Censorship in Turkey
Media freedom in Turkey
Turkey's media purge after the failed July 2016 coup d'état
International Freedom of Expression Exchange
Human rights in Europe
Human rights in Turkey
Lists:
List of prosecuted Turkish writers
List of arrested mayors in Turkey
List of journalists killed in Turkey

References

External links 

 List of journalists in jail as of 28 January 2017. (turkeypurge.com)
 Turkey's Press Freedom Woes Worse Than You Think. (stockholmcf.org) This page has several PDF reports that include list of journalists in jail as of 24 January 2018.
 A list of arrested journalists throughout the history of Turkey up to November 2016, compiled by Turhan Güney of Cumhuriyet (bianet.org)

Human rights abuses in Turkey
 Arrested
Imprisoned journalists
Lists of journalists
Journalists
Lists of people by legal status